Chagherbit, also rendered as Joghrbit and Jowgharbit, may refer to:
 Chagherbit-e Bala
 Chagherbit-e Pain